FC Metalurh Komsomolske was a Ukrainian football club from Komsomolske, Donetsk Oblast.

League and cup history

{|class="wikitable"
|-bgcolor="#efefef"
! Season
! Div.
! Pos.
! Pl.
! W
! D
! L
! GS
! GA
! P
!Domestic Cup
!colspan=2|Europe
!Notes
|}

Metalurh Komsomolske, FC
Football clubs in Donetsk Oblast
Association football clubs disestablished in 2005
2005 disestablishments in Ukraine
Metallurgy association football clubs in Ukraine